Aik Din (Urdu: ایک دن) by Bano Qudsia is an Urdu novel. The title this novel has 'Aik Din' implies 'One Day' in English. This novel is based on a social reforming story written in a classic way which seems to be very close to reality.

References 

1981 novels
Urdu-language literature
Urdu-language fiction
Books by Bano Qudsia
Urdu-language novels